David Reno Bacuzzi (12 October 1940 – 21 April 2020) was an English footballer and manager who played for Arsenal, Manchester City and Reading. He also represented England as a youth international. After a moderately successful career in the English League, Bacuzzi settled in the Republic of Ireland where he enjoyed a successful spell as player-manager with Cork Hibernians before going on to manage Home Farm. He later opened a travel agency in Dublin.

Bacuzzi was born into an Anglo-Italian family that had settled in London. His paternal grandparents originally came from Milan. His father, Joe Bacuzzi, was also a notable footballer, playing as a defender for both Fulham and England during the Second World War.

Playing career

Early years
Born in Islington, London, Bacuzzi began his career with Eastbourne United under the guidance of coach Ron Greenwood. When Greenwood was appointed assistant manager at Arsenal, Bacuzzi eventually followed him.

Arsenal
Bacuzzi signed as amateur for Arsenal in March 1958 and then as a professional in May 1959. He made his First Division debut for the club on 18 February 1961, taking the place of the injured Len Wills, in a 3–2 win against West Bromwich Albion. During the 1961–62 season he shared the right-back position with Eddie Magill, playing 22 games. The following season, he lost his place and, as Magill became the first-choice right-back, Bacuzzi only played another 11 first-team matches during 1962–63 and 1963–64 seasons. He did, however, help Arsenal Reserves win the Football Combination in 1962–63. In total he played 48 games for the Arsenal first team.

Manchester City
Bacuzzi signed for Manchester City on 24 April 1964 for a fee of £25,000 and made his league debut for the club in the second game of the 1964–65 season, a 6–0 win against Leyton Orient. During the season, which saw City finish as Second Division champions, he played a total of 44 games, a figure matched by only one other City player, Alan Oakes. Bacuzzi started the 1965–66 season as the first choice right-back under new manager Joe Mercer but as the season went on, he found his place taken by Bobby Kennedy. He played a further 16 times for City before being transferred to Reading.

Reading
Bacuzzi signed for Reading on 9 September 1966 for a fee of £5,000. On 31 January 1968 Reading played against Bacuzzi's former club Manchester City in the FA Cup. They held City to a credible 0–0 draw at Maine Road but then lost the replay 7–0.

Coaching career

Cork Hibernians
In May 1970 Bacuzzi joined Cork Hibernians as player-manager. Initially, Bacuzzi thought he had been approached from a mysterious exotic location when he received a misspelled telegram asking him to contact Cork Island instead of Cork, Ireland. Bacuzzi subsequently guided Hibs to the League of Ireland title in 1971, beating Shamrock Rovers in a play-off. Then in 1972 and 1973 he also guided them to successive victories in FAI Cup finals.

Home Farm
In 1974 Bacuzzi was appointed manager of Home Farm and in 1975 he guided the club to victory in the FAI Cup for their first and only time. With a team that included Noel King, Dermot Keely and Martin Murray, they beat Dundalk, Cork Celtic and St Patrick's Athletic in earlier rounds before defeating Shelbourne 1–0 in the final at Dalymount Park. As a result, they became the first amateur team to win FAI Cup in forty years. The following season Bacuzzi took Home Farm into Europe as they competed in the European Cup Winners Cup, playing against French side, RC Lens. They drew 1–1 at home but lost the away leg 6–0.

As manager of Home Farm, Bacuzzi was responsible for the development of several Republic of Ireland internationals including Ronnie Whelan, Ken DeMange and Brian Mooney, all of whom subsequently signed for Liverpool. However, he also turned down the opportunity to sign a young Paul McGrath after a brief trial.

He also managed the League of Ireland XI during the qualifiers for the 1976 and 1980 Olympic Football Tournaments  and the amateur team that qualified for the 1978 UEFA Amateur Cup.

He was briefly assistant manager at Shamrock Rovers under Jim McLaughlin in 1985.

Honours
Player

Arsenal Reserves

Football Combination
Winners 1962–63: 1

Manchester City

Second Division
Winners 1964–65: 1

Manager

Cork Hibernians

League of Ireland
Winners 1970–71: 1
FAI Cup
Winners 1972, 1973: 2
Blaxnit Cup
Winners 1972: 1
Dublin City Cup
Winners 1971, 1973: 2
League of Ireland Shield
Winners 1970, 1973: 2
Munster Senior Cup
Winners 1970, 1971, 1973: 3

Home Farm

FAI Cup
Winners 1975: 1
 SWAI Personality of the Year
 Cork Hibernians F.C. – 1971/72

Death
Bacuzzi died on 21 April 2020, aged 79, in St. Vincent's University Hospital, Dublin, from COVID-19 during the COVID-19 pandemic in the Republic of Ireland.

References

Sources
 Who's Who of Arsenal (2007): Tony Matthews 
 Maine Road Favourites – Where Are They Now ? (2006): Ian Penney with Fred Eyre

External links
 Dave Bacuzzi at arsenalfc.com

1940 births
2020 deaths
English footballers
English football managers
League of Ireland players
League of Ireland managers
Home Farm F.C. coaches
Arsenal F.C. players
Manchester City F.C. players
Reading F.C. players
Footballers from Islington (district)
English people of Italian descent
Cork Hibernians F.C. players
League of Ireland XI players
League of Ireland XI managers
Association football defenders
English expatriate football managers
English expatriates in Ireland
Deaths from the COVID-19 pandemic in the Republic of Ireland